Maghsoudbeyk Mosque is near the northeastern corner of Naqsh-e Jahan Square. It was built in 1601 by the order of Maghsoudbeyk, who was one of the very rich stewards of Abbas I. There is an inscription in the mihrab of this mosque, which is one of artworks of the famous calligrapher of the Safavid era Ali Reza Abbassi. It's said, after that Shah Abbas was very satisfied with this inscription, he ordered Ali Reza Abbassi to work on the inscriptions of Sheikh Lotfollah Mosque. Behind the entrance hall of the mosque in a small chamber, there's a tomb which is the tomb of Mir Emad, the art rival of Ali Reza Abbassi. Maghsoudbeyk mosque was a very glorious and beautiful mosque in Isfahan in the Safavid era.

See also
 Islam in Iran

References 

Mosques completed in 1601
Mosques in Isfahan
17th-century mosques